The Belfast Wheel was a  tall transportable Ferris wheel installation in the centre of Belfast, Northern Ireland, in the grounds on the east side of Belfast City Hall.  It operated from November 2007 to April 2010.

History
The Belfast Wheel was brought to Belfast in partnership with Belfast City Council and the Department for Social Development. It was operated by World Tourist Attractions.

It opened in November 2007 and operated seven days a week. Views right across Belfast and Belfast Lough could be seen.

In May 2009, Belfast City Council voted to keep the big wheel on site for a further two years, from 1 September 2009. On 30 November 2009, the location of the Belfast Wheel again caused a row, resulting in the Lord Mayor of Belfast Naomi Long discussing the potential move of the Titanic Memorial before the 2012 anniversary.

The Belfast Wheel closed for business on Sunday 11 April 2010. The operator, Great City Attractions, had announced a few weeks previously that it would be removed.

Protest

References

External links
Belfast City's official web page for the Belfast Wheel

Transportable Ferris wheels
Buildings and structures in Belfast
Tourist attractions in Belfast